Rhymney Quarry is a Site of Special Scientific Interest in Rumney, Cardiff, Wales.

See also
List of Sites of Special Scientific Interest in Mid & South Glamorgan

Sites of Special Scientific Interest in Cardiff
Quarries in Wales